Iota Trianguli, Latinized from ι Trianguli, is a quadruple star system in constellation of Triangulum. The pair have a combined apparent magnitude of 4.95 and are approximately 290 light years from Earth.

Both components of ι Trianguli are spectroscopic binaries and the brighter pair is variable. It has been given the variable star designation TZ Trianguli. The variations are due to the ellipsoidal shape of the stars as they rotate, and also it is classified as an RS Canum Venaticorum variable.

Together with 10 Trianguli and 12 Trianguli, it forms part of the obsolete Triangulum Minus.

References

External links

F-type main-sequence stars
Rotating ellipsoidal variables
RS Canum Venaticorum variables
Trianguli, TZ
Spectroscopic binaries
4
Trianguli, Iota
Triangulum (constellation)
Durchmusterung objects
Trianguli, 06
013480
010280
0642
G-type giants